The arrondissement of Château-Chinon (Ville) is an arrondissement of France in the Nièvre department in the Bourgogne-Franche-Comté region. It has 80 communes.

Composition

The communes of the arrondissement of Château-Chinon (Ville), and their INSEE codes, are:

 Achun (58001)
 Alligny-en-Morvan (58003)
 Alluy (58004)
 Arleuf (58010)
 Aunay-en-Bazois (58017)
 Avrée (58019)
 Bazoches (58023)
 Biches (58030)
 Blismes (58034)
 Brassy (58037)
 Brinay (58040)
 Cercy-la-Tour (58046)
 Chalaux (58049)
 Charrin (58060)
 Château-Chinon (Campagne) (58063)
 Château-Chinon (Ville) (58062)
 Châtillon-en-Bazois (58065)
 Châtin (58066)
 Chaumard (58068)
 Chiddes (58074)
 Chougny (58076)
 Corancy (58082)
 Dommartin (58099)
 Dun-les-Places (58106)
 Dun-sur-Grandry (58107)
 Empury (58108)
 Fâchin (58111)
 Fléty (58114)
 Fours (58118)
 Gien-sur-Cure (58125)
 Glux-en-Glenne (58128)
 Gouloux (58129)
 Isenay (58135)
 Lanty (58139)
 Larochemillay (58140)
 Lavault-de-Frétoy (58141)
 Limanton (58142)
 Lormes (58145)
 Luzy (58149)
 Marigny-l'Église (58157)
 Maux (58161)
 Millay (58168)
 Montambert (58172)
 Montapas (58171)
 Montaron (58173)
 Mont-et-Marré (58175)
 Montigny-en-Morvan (58177)
 Montigny-sur-Canne (58178)
 Montsauche-les-Settons (58180)
 Moulins-Engilbert (58182)
 Moux-en-Morvan (58185)
 La Nocle-Maulaix (58195)
 Onlay (58199)
 Ougny (58202)
 Ouroux-en-Morvan (58205)
 Planchez (58210)
 Poil (58211)
 Préporché (58219)
 Rémilly (58221)
 Saint-Agnan (58226)
 Saint-André-en-Morvan (58229)
 Saint-Brisson (58235)
 Saint-Gratien-Savigny (58243)
 Saint-Hilaire-en-Morvan (58244)
 Saint-Hilaire-Fontaine (58245)
 Saint-Honoré-les-Bains (58246)
 Saint-Léger-de-Fougeret (58249)
 Saint-Martin-du-Puy (58255)
 Saint-Péreuse (58262)
 Saint-Seine (58268)
 Savigny-Poil-Fol (58274)
 Sémelay (58276)
 Sermages (58277)
 Tamnay-en-Bazois (58285)
 Tazilly (58287)
 Ternant (58289)
 Thaix (58290)
 Tintury (58292)
 Vandenesse (58301)
 Villapourçon (58309)

History

The arrondissement of Château-Chinon was created in 1800. At the January 2017 reorganisation of the arrondissements of Nièvre, it gained nine communes from the arrondissement of Clamecy and one commune from the arrondissement of Nevers, and it lost one commune to the arrondissement of Clamecy and one commune to the arrondissement of Nevers.

As a result of the reorganisation of the cantons of France which came into effect in 2015, the borders of the cantons are no longer related to the borders of the arrondissements. The cantons of the arrondissement of Château-Chinon were, as of January 2015:

 Château-Chinon (Ville)
 Châtillon-en-Bazois
 Fours
 Luzy
 Montsauche-les-Settons
 Moulins-Engilbert

References

Chateau-Chinon